The 1994 Grampian Regional Council election, the sixth and final election to Grampian Regional Council, was held on 5 May 1994 as part of the wider 1994 Scottish regional elections. The election saw the Liberal Democrats take the most seats, although the Scottish National Party had a higher number of votes. No party gained an overall majority.

Aggregate Results

Ward Results

References

1994 Scottish local elections
May 1994 events in the United Kingdom